Oga Yashiro is a traitor who offered to let Takeda Katsuyori into the Tokugawa-controlled castle at Okazaki.  His plot was discovered and he died by the bamboo saw after 7 days.

References

Samurai
Year of birth missing
Year of death missing